The Afro-Asian Film Festival (AAFF) was an International film festival which was held in Tashkent, Cairo, and Jakarta during 1958, 1960, and 1964 respectively. The first Afro-Asian Film Festival took place in Tashkent, Uzbekistan in 1958. A total of 14 Asian and African countries participated, along with eight other Soviet Asian nations.

History
Afro-Asian cinematic exchange took off during the 1955 Afro-Asian Conference in Bandung, Indonesia. During that time large number of film industries in Japan, India, and Egypt took over other national cinemas in the region. Most of the African territories remained had no independent regional film industries. The official festival communique was announced in accordance with the "principles of the Bandung Conference" and "under the sign of peace and friendship among peoples". After two more editions in Cairo and Jakarta the Afro-Asian festival officially ended in 1964 due to political differences.

Competitive Awards 1958, Tashkent
Best Film
Best Actor
Best Actress
Best Music Direction
Best Art Direction
Best Documentary Film

Competitive Awards 1960, Cairo
Best Film
Best Actor - Sivaji Ganesan for Veerapandiya Kattabomman
Best Actress
Best Music Direction
Best Art Direction
Best Documentary Film

Competitive Awards 1964, Jakarta
Best Film
Best Actor
Best Actress
Best Music Direction
Best Art Direction
Best Documentary Film

References

Film festivals held in multiple countries
Awards established in 1958
Film festivals in Indonesia
Film festivals in Egypt
Asian film awards
Festivals in Uzbekistan